Chryseobacterium gleum  is a bacterium from the genus of Chryseobacterium which has been isolated from a high vaginal swab from a human in London in England. Chryseobacterium gleum can cause infections in humans.

References

Further reading

External links
Type strain of Chryseobacterium gleum at BacDive -  the Bacterial Diversity Metadatabase	

gleum
Bacteria described in 1994